Telma Louise Hopkins (born October 28, 1948) is an American actress and singer. Hopkins rose to prominence as a member of the 1970s pop music group Tony Orlando and Dawn, which had several number-one songs. She also performed on the CBS variety show Tony Orlando and Dawn from 1974 until 1976 along with Tony Orlando and Joyce Vincent Wilson. In the late 1970s, Hopkins began working as an actress, playing roles on various sitcoms, including Isabelle Hammond on Bosom Buddies (1980–82), Adelaide "Addy" Wilson on Gimme a Break! (1983–87) and Family Matters (1989–1997) as Rachel Baines–Crawford. 
As lead actress, Hopkins starred on Getting By from 1993 to 1994. In recent years, Hopkins was a regular cast member on Half & Half (2002–06) portraying Phyllis Thorne, Are We There Yet? (2010–13), and short-lived Partners (2014). In film, Hopkins co-starred in 1984 science fiction film Trancers and in its sequels Trancers II (1991) and Trancers III (1992), as well as appearing in The Wood (1999) and The Love Guru (2008).

Career

Music

Hopkins started her career as a background singer in Detroit, Michigan, singing on many of the Golden World, Motown, Invictus Records, and Hot Wax Records hits. She appeared on such classics as Freda Payne's "Band of Gold" and Isaac Hayes' "Theme from Shaft" and working with legendary artists like the Four Tops and Marvin Gaye.

Hopkins and Joyce Vincent Wilson were recruited by Tony Orlando to form the vocal group Dawn. As a recording act, Tony Orlando and Dawn would have much success throughout the second half of the 1970s, releasing 16 top-40 singles, three of which reached #1, and starring in a CBS variety show (entitled Tony Orlando and Dawn) from 1974-76. In 1977, Tony Orlando and Dawn announced their retirement.

Television and film
In 1979, Hopkins made her acting debut playing Daisy in the ABC miniseries Roots: The Next Generations. Later that year, she co-starred alongside Eileen Brennan on the short-lived ABC sitcom A New Kind of Family. The following year, she was cast opposite Tom Hanks and Peter Scolari in another ABC sitcom, Bosom Buddies. The series was cancelled in 1982 after two seasons. 

In 1983, Hopkins joined the cast of NBC sitcom Gimme a Break! starring Nell Carter. She played Adelaide "Addy" Wilson, Nell's childhood friend, until the series finale in 1987. 

In 1989, Hopkins began starring as Rachel Baines-Crawford in the ABC sitcom Family Matters. She left the series after four seasons as a regular cast member, to star (with Cindy Williams) as the co-lead of the sitcom Getting By which aired for two seasons (one on ABC, the other on NBC) from 1993-94. She later returned to Family Matters, making recurring appearances in the sixth season and guest-starring in the Season 9 Christmas episode "Deck the Malls" in 1997.

In later years, she appeared as Richard T. Jones' mother in the romantic comedy The Wood (1999), and played Romany Malco's mother in the comedy film The Love Guru (2008). She appeared in JD Lawrence's stage play The Clean Up Woman in October 2008.

From 2002 to 2006, she starred in the UPN sitcom Half & Half alongside Rachel True, Essence Atkins and Valarie Pettiford. She also had recurring roles on The Hughleys and Any Day Now. From 2010 to 2013, she co-starred alongside Terry Crews and Essence Atkins in the TBS sitcom Are We There Yet?.

In 2014, she played Martin Lawrence's mother on the FX sitcom Partners. In 2016, she was cast as Jerrika Hinton's mother in the ABC comedy pilot Toast, produced by ShondaLand.

In May 2021, it was announced Hopkins had been cast in the role of Denise Tolliver on The Young and the Restless, reuniting her with Family Matters co-star Bryton James.

Personal life and other work
Hopkins was raised in Highland Park, Michigan. She was married to Donald B. Allen from 1970 until 1977. Together, they have a son.

Hopkins often volunteers for charitable causes. She has worked with Caring for Babies with AIDS, Act on Arthritis and the PTA. She also mentors children.

Filmography

Film

Television

References

External links
 
 
 
 www.kellie.de/telmahopkins.htm
 www.classicbands.com/dawn.html

1948 births
Living people
20th-century African-American women singers
Tony Orlando and Dawn members
20th-century American actresses
21st-century American actresses
African-American actresses
American television actresses
American film actresses
American voice actresses
Musicians from Louisville, Kentucky
Actresses from Louisville, Kentucky
Singers from Kentucky
Kentucky women musicians
21st-century African-American women
21st-century African-American people